3rd CC.NN. Division "Penne Nere", ("Black Feathers"), was one of the three Blackshirt divisions (Camicie Nere, or CC.NN.) sent to Spain during the Spanish Civil War to make up the "Corpo Truppe Volontarie" (Corps of Volunteer Troops), or CTV.

3rd CC.NN. Division "Penne Nere" - Bgd. Gen. Luigi Nuvoloni 
 9th Group of Banderas - Console Mario Pittau.
 ? Bandera - ?
 ? Bandera - ?
 ? Bandera - ?
 Support Battery 65/17
 Engineers Section
 10th Group of Banderas - Console Generale Giovanni Martini
 824 Bandera "Tembien" - 1st Seniore Francesco Grosso
 835 Bandera "Scire" - Seniore Luigi Falzone
 840 Bandera "Carso" - Seniore Gaetano Spallone
 Support Battery 65/17 
 Engineers Section
 11th Grupo de Banderas - Console Generale Alberto Liuzzi
 830 Bandera - ? 
 851 Bandera "Vampa" - Seniore Giuseppe Busalacchi
 635 Bandera "Freccia" - ?
 Support Battery 65/17
 Engineers Section
 "Carabinieri" Section
 Intendencia Section
 Sanitation Section
 Division Truck Unit

The CC.NN. Divisions contained regular soldiers and volunteer militia from the National Fascist Party. The CC.NN. divisions were semi-motorised.

Sources 
de Mesa, José Luis, El regreso de las legiones: (la ayuda militar italiana à la España nacional, 1936-1939),  García Hispán, Granada:España, 1994 

Divisions of Italy in the Spanish Civil War
Blackshirt divisions of Italy